My Way or the Highway is an album by the American indie rock band Tuscadero, released in 1998.

Production
The band devoted more time to constructing the songs, while also attempting to avoid creating an overly slick record. Guitar players Melissa Farris and Margaret McCartney often employed fuzz tones on the album, and also made use of technically inferior "trashy" sound equipment. The album was produced by Keith Cleversley.

Critical reception

The Washington Post thought that "the band's appeal does get lost in the ornate production of a few of these tracks, notably the over-orchestrated 'Dr. Doom' and the anti-super model 'Paper Dolls', which rides its funky sax sound to the six-minute mark." Robert Christgau praised the "songcraft as end-in-itself." 

Tulsa World called the album "fun, gritty pop," noting Farris's "reverence for the Pretenders/Blondie ethos." Entertainment Weekly opined that "sonic departures like the slinky antifashion anthem 'Paper Dolls' and the flamboyantly James Bondish 'Dr. Doom' neatly transcend alt-guitar-rock limitations." The Dayton Daily News wrote: "Meaty hooks and solid crunch back up songs that mostly pick on campus rock-band preptiles who overindulge in, um, passably clever pop-cultural strip mining." 

AllMusic wrote that the "heady concoction of fizzy pop hooks, teen melodrama, slamming punk, and misfit glee makes My Way or the Highway an intoxicating punk-pop rush."

Track listing

References

1998 albums
Elektra Records albums